Erythrococca columnaris is a species of plant in the family Euphorbiaceae. It is endemic to Príncipe.

References

Acalypheae
Flora of Príncipe
Vulnerable plants
Taxonomy articles created by Polbot